Abigail Kimber (1804 – 22 March 1871) was an American botanist, botanical collector, social reformer, abolitionist, and women’s rights activist.

Early life 
Abigail Kimber, nicknamed Abby, was born in Philadelphia, Pennsylvania in 1804 to parents Emmor and Susan Kimber. Emmor and Susan ran a Quaking girls boarding school called Kimberton, considered one of the three most important boarding schools in southeastern rural Pennsylvania in the 1830s. The school survived only 32 years, from 1818 until Emmor Kimber's death in 1850, but during its time it came to specialize in training pupils to become teachers. Abigail, along with her sisters Mary and Martha, did the teaching for the school, with Abigail beginning to teach at age 14 and taking responsibility for the school's curriculum in the 1820s. Kimberton was considered a unique school because the Kimbers were involved in reform movements of the time, and often involved their students, with Abigail even taking students to temperance meetings with her. Gertrude K. Wilson, a Kimberton student, wrote that the students "absorbed a love of right and hatred of wrong and oppression which made us what was then called abolitionists." Many students spoke fondly of Abigail, saying that her example and noble purposes in life inspired them to become teachers and to better themselves as people. Kimber continued teaching for the 30 years that Kimberton remained open.

Social activism 
Abigail Kimber was an anti-slavery activist, taking an active role in the Philadelphia Female Anti-Slavery Society as Recording Secretary, Vice President, and President at different periods throughout her involvement. Kimber was also on the Executive Committee of the Pennsylvania Anti-Slavery Society. In June of 1840, Kimber attended the World Antislavery Convention, which met in London.  Kimber and her fellow female delegates from Massachusetts had been denied seats in the convention and were excluded from membership, but several American abolitionist societies sent their female delegates anyways. Through her travels to the convention, Kimber met and debated with British women on the "Woman Question", never giving up on her commitment to the cause of male and female freedoms. Throughout her life, Kimber continued to take part in the abolitionist movement and promote the rights of women.

Botany collections 
Kimber taught chemistry and botany at the Kimberton Boarding School for Girls, teaching pupils such as Graceanna Lewis, who would later go on to become a natural history teacher herself. Kimber also achieved fame in the botanist community as a plant collector. Kimber is noted as the second recorded donator of plant objects to the Delaware County Institute of Science. The donation was submitted on November 22, 1834 and consisted of “Brown hematite and plumbago," a type of mineral and a shrub. Kimber was noted to collect both plants and minerals, which she forwarded to William Darlington, who went on to cite her collections in his 1837 and 1853 editions of his botanical index Flora Cestrica: An Attempt to Enumerate and Describe the Flowering and Filicoid Plants of Chester County, in the State of Pennsylvania. William Darlington later argued in the 1853 edition of his index that the best way to diffuse botany was to educate women in the science, perhaps inspired by the women botanists he interacted with, including Kimber.

Death 
Abigail Kimber died on March 22, 1871 in Philadelphia, Pennsylvania at the age of 66 or 67 (as her exact birth date is unknown) of unknown causes.

Publications 
 Familiar Botany; to which is added, a Complete Botanical Dictionary, 12 mo. Philadelphia, 1854.

References 

1804 births
1871 deaths
Activists from Philadelphia
Educators from Philadelphia
19th-century American women scientists
Plant collectors
American women's rights activists
Scientists from Philadelphia
American abolitionists
19th-century American botanists
19th-century American women educators
19th-century American educators
Schoolteachers from Pennsylvania
People from Chester County, Pennsylvania